Jamiat Ulema-e-Islam Bangladesh (Bengali: জমিয়তে উলামায়ে ইসলাম বাংলাদেশ) is a Bangladeshi Islamist Party registered with Bangladesh Election Commission. Jamiat Ulema-e-Islam Bangladesh was a member of the Islamist 20-Party alliance. It was a member of Islami Oikya Jote and which it left in 2008.

History
Muhammad Wakkas, Secretary General of Jamiat Ulema-e-Islam Bangladesh, was elected to parliament in 1986 and 1988 from Jessore-5 as a candidate of Jatiya Party. He served as the Minister of Religious Affairs in the Cabinet of President Hussain Mohammad Ershad.

In 2016, the Jamiat Ulema-e-Islam Bangladesh organized a protest against Islamic militancy in Dhaka.

In 2017, Hefazat-e-Islam Bangladesh sought nominations from Jamiat Ulema-e-Islam Bangladesh, and other Islamist parities, to contest the upcoming General Election in 2018.

Nur Hossain Kasemi, Secretary General of Jamiat Ulema-e-Islam Bangladesh criticised the government of India seeking Bangladeshi land to build an airport in Agartala, Tripura in August 2019.

In 2020, the Jamiat Ulema-e-Islam Bangladesh campaigned to cancel the invitation to Prime Minister Narendra Modi to visit Bangladesh by the Government of Bangladesh.

Leaders 
Deen Muhammad Khan
Ashraf Ali Bishwanathi
Muhiuddin Khan
Abdul Momin Imambari 
Zia Uddin

See also 
 List of Deobandi organisations

References

Islamic political parties in Bangladesh
Far-right politics in Bangladesh
Political parties in Bangladesh
Political parties with year of establishment missing
Deobandi organisations
 
Jamiat Ulema-e-Islam